The Verkhnedneprovsk uezd was one of the subdivisions of the Yekaterinoslav Governorate of the Russian Empire. It was situated in the western part of the governorate. Its administrative centre was Verkhnodniprovsk (Verkhnedneprovsk).

Demographics
At the time of the Russian Empire Census of 1897, Verkhnedneprovsky Uyezd had a population of 211,674. Of these, 90.3% spoke Ukrainian, 4.7% Russian, 2.6% Yiddish, 2.1% German, 0.1% Belarusian and 0.1% Polish as their native language.

References

 
Uyezds of Yekaterinoslav Governorate
Yekaterinoslav Governorate